Birdbrook railway station was located  to the northeast of the village of Birdbrook, Essex. It opened in 1863 as the replacement for Whitley station, and closed in 1962.

References

External links
 Birdbrook station on navigable 1946 O. S. map
 
 Birdbrook station on Birdbrook Village Website

Disused railway stations in Essex
Former Colne Valley and Halstead Railway stations
Railway stations in Great Britain opened in 1863
Railway stations in Great Britain closed in 1962